Hadim is a town and district of Konya Province in the Akdeniz region of Turkey. According to 2000 census, population of the district is 59,941 of which 16,620 live in the town of Hadim.

History
The area now known as Hadim was settled by a tribe of Turkmen originating from Bukhara following the Seljuk  victory at the battle of Malazgirt. Hadim was well regarded in Ottoman times as a source for Islamic scholars and their training, this is reflected in the villages previous name, Belde-i Hadimül-ilm meaning place which serves the sciences. 

The scholars of Hadim fulfilled an important role in the  Turkification of Anatolia. A notable scholar from Hadim was Seyyid Bayram Veli who founded the village of Dedemli in Hadim district. Bayram Veli was a dervish who had migrated from the region of Khorosan to avoid the incoming Mongol invasion. He was known to give spiritual and religious advice to sultan Alâeddin Keykubat I of the Sultanate of Rum.

Hadim had a number of Sayyid families with many of them the descendants of Hüsameddin Efendi who was a descendant of Ja'far al-Sadiq. the most influential of Hüsameddins descendants was Ebu Said Muhammed Hâdimî. Ebu Said hadimi was known as one of the greatest scholars of his time and performed sermons in the Ayasofya-i Kebir Cami-i Şerifi upon the invitation of sultan Mahmud I

Notes

Hadim is a rare and highly respected Persian Last Name. The origin of Hadim is from Turkey.

References

External links
 District governor's official website 
 District municipality's official website 

Populated places in Konya Province
Districts of Konya Province